Maëlle Gavet (born May 22, 1978) is a French businesswoman, author, and entrepreneur.

Birth and education 
Gavet was born in the Paris region of Boulogne-Billancourt, France in a “lower middle class” home. She started her first business organizing children's birthday parties in the Paris suburbs when she was 16.  She studied Russian language in school in order to increase her chance to get into an elite college.

In 2000 she graduated from the Sorbonne, in 2002, from the Institut d'Etudes politiques de Paris, and in 2003, from the Ecole Normale Superieure de Lettres et Sciences humaines. Gavet speaks French, Russian and English.

Career 
After college, Gavet joined the Boston Consulting Group and worked there from 2003 to 2009. She left there as a principal, having lived in France, UK, India and South Africa.

In 2009, Gavet joined OZON.ru, "The Amazon.com of Russia," as Sales and Marketing Director. She was promoted to Chief Executive Officer of OZON Holdings in July 2011, Russia's e-commerce business. Gavet led the company through two rounds of funding, 2011 ($100 Million) and 2014 ($150 Million). In February 2012 Gavet led OZON to acquire Sapato.ru, Russia's online shoe and accessory retailer. In May 2014, OZON acquired a stake in the Russian eBook distribution platform, LitRes.ru.

Gavet then joined The Priceline Group in June 2015 as executive vice president of Global Operations.

In 2017, following the abrupt departure of CEO Darren Houston, Gavet joined Compass Inc in January 2017 as COO. In September 2019, Gavet publicly announced she would leave Compass Inc in October 2019. 

In 2020, Gavet wrote the book, Trampled by Unicorns, about technology and empathy. She was also raising money from investors to buy a technology company.

In January of 2021, Gavet became CEO and a board member at Techstars.

Mentions 
Gavet entered into several international ratings, including one called "The world’s most powerful women — Women to watch", made by Forbes. She also took 10th place out of 100 in a list of "Most creative people in business" by Fast Company and 26th place in rating 40 under 40 by Fortune.

She has been ranked as one of the top 100 French young leaders by Le Figaro and Choiseul 100:
 In 2014 she was ranked #96
 In 2015 she was ranked #39 
 In 2016 she was ranked #4 

In 2014 she was listed fifth among Times Magazine's List of The Top 25 Female Techpreneurs.

In 2015 she was listed as one of 50 most powerful tech women in Europe by Inspiring 50 and the European Commission.

In 2016 she was recognized as a Young Global Leader by the World Economic Forum.

References

External links 
 
 
 Max Chafkin. Is this Jeff Bezos of Russia? Fast Company
 Maelle Gavet. Investors should give Russia a second look. CNN
 Maelle Gavet Russian ecommerce is reaching a tipping point. It’s time that Europe and the US took note. The Next Web
 Forbes Most Powerful Women Europe. Russia, The Inside Story

1978 births
Living people
People from Boulogne-Billancourt
Chief operating officers
French women chief executives
Women corporate executives
Women corporate directors
ENS Fontenay-Saint-Cloud-Lyon alumni
Sciences Po alumni